HHR may stand for:

 Chevrolet HHR, an automobile
 Hawthorne Municipal Airport (California)
 Health Hazard Rating
 Health human resources
 Hellingly Hospital Railway, a defunct English railway
 The Heritage Hotel Rockhampton, in Queensland, Australia
 Home for Human Rights
 Hridaypur railway station, in West Bengal, India
 Hughes, Hubbard & Reed, an American law firm
 Hydra Head Records, a record label
 Jola-Felupe language, spoken in Senegal and Guinea-Bissau